The Best Yet is a studio album by American country music artist Margo Smith. It was released in 1987 via Playback Records and originally contained a total of ten tracks. The album was mostly a collection of traditional pop standards and mixed in new songs as well. It would spawn a charting single 1988 and also receive positive reviews from critics.

Background and content
Margo Smith had her greatest commercial success as a country artist in the late 1970s, with major hits like "Don't Break the Heart That Loves You" and "Still a Woman." She later left her record label, Warner Bros. and began releasing music through independent companies during the 1980s. Among these albums was The Best Yet. Smith recorded the project in 1987 at LSI Studios, alongside producers Jack Gale and Jim Pierce. The recording sessions for the record took place in Nashville, Tennessee. The project contained ten tracks of new material. Seven of the songs selected were cover versions originally recorded in the traditional pop music genre by various artists. Among the songs chosen was "You Belong to Me", "Love Letters in the Sand" and "Wheel of Fortune." Also included was three tracks of new material: "Alone", "I'm Only Fillin' In" and "Heart Times".

Release and reception
The Best Yet was released in 1987 on Playback Records. It was originally offered as a vinyl LP, containing five songs on either side of the record. In later years, the album was re-released in a digital format via K-tel Records, containing "Echo Me" as a bonus track. Billboard magazine originally gave the record a mixed review in 1987: "Her voice sounds a little strident at times, but Smith knows how to reach the heart of some of the great pop tunes that commanded the charts before rock 'n' roll rolled in." The Best Yet originally spawned a total of two singles. Its first single was issued in 1987, "Alone". In 1988, "Hold Me" was spawned as a single. The 2013 re-working of the album included Smith's 1988 single, "Echo Me". In the single's original release, it peaked at number 77 on the Billboard Hot Country Songs chart. It is Smith's final-charting single on the country chart to date.

Track listing

Vinyl version

Digital version

Release history

References

1987 albums
Margo Smith albums